The 1928–29 Panhellenic Championship was not held due to serious financial problems, as the organization of friendly matches between the POK members had led the HFF to economic and competitive decline. The return of the members of POK to the HFF in July 1928 and the desire of both sides to hold the championship did not succeed, as the championships of Athens, Piraeus and Macedonia were held, in which Panathinaikos and Olympiacos alongside Ethnikos Piraeus and Aris finished first respectively, but there was a significant delay in their completion, as a result of which the Panhellenic championship was not held, since the summer had already arrived and there was a strong fear of another financial failure.

Qualification round

Athens Football Clubs Association

Piraeus Football Clubs Association

|+Championship play-offs

|}

*The 1st half ends with 1–0 in favor of Olympiacos and in the 2nd half Ethnikos manages to equalize. Ethnikos also scored a second goal after a clash between the goalkeeper of Olympiacos and 3 players of Ethnikos, after he had previously blocked the ball and thus was considered a foul. The game continues until a fan invades the field and attacks an Olympiacos' player and then a general conflict ensues as other fans invade. In the end, the game never continued and did not go to extra time and it was stopped permanently,

Macedonia Football Clubs Association

|+Final

|}

Matches

Aris won 5–4 on aggregate.

Final round

Not played.

See also
P.O.K.

References

External links
Rsssf, 1928–29 championship
Andreas Bomis, "Goal 2000. A century of football", p. 222–223.

Panhellenic Championship seasons
Greek
1928–29 in Greek football